Deltaspis cruentus is a species of beetle in the family Cerambycidae. It was described by John Lawrence LeConte in 1862.

References

Deltaspis
Beetles described in 1862